Kenneth Gwynne Kent (10 December 1901 – 29 December 1974) was an English cricketer.  Kent was a right-handed batsman who bowled right-arm fast-medium.  He was born at Sparkbrook, Warwickshire, and was educated at King Edward's School, Birmingham.

Kent made his first-class debut for Warwickshire against Lancashire in the 1927 County Championship at Edgbaston. He made eight further first-class appearances for the county, the last of which came against Middlesex in the 1931 County Championship. In his nine matches for Warwickshire, he took 10 wickets at an average of 63.90, with best figures of 3/91.  With the bat, he scored 40 runs at an average of 4.44, with a high score of 23 not out.

He died at Fife, Scotland, on 29 December 1974.

References

External links
Kenneth Kent at ESPNcricinfo

1901 births
1974 deaths
Cricketers from Birmingham, West Midlands
People educated at King Edward's School, Birmingham
English cricketers
Warwickshire cricketers
English cricketers of 1919 to 1945